Nadir Ali (born 2 September 1991) is a Pakistani YouTube personality and comedian who is known for his channel P4 Pakao. Ali started his channel in 2016 and subsequently uploaded his first video as a hair dresser. He is the first Pakistani to get over three million subscribers on YouTube.

His pranks are popular not only in Pakistan but also abroad, especially in India and Dubai. Nadir was inspired by this response to travel to places like Thailand to record new pranks.

Career 
Prior to his YouTube career, he worked in famous Pakistani prank show Zara Hut Kay which was aired on Metro TV. Nadir entertained people in the same way from 2010 to 2016. In 2016, Nadir began posting videos to YouTube. In 2020, the tax department notified him about some tax payments.

Nadir Ali has so far produced a large number of prank videos, the most of which were recorded in Karachi and only a small number in Lahore. He also recorded their prank videos in Sri Lank, Thailand, Bangkok and in Dubai.

Personal life 
Nadir was born on 2 Sep 1991 in Karachi, Pakistan. He is married and has a son.

References 

Living people
Pakistani YouTubers
1991 births